is a railway station on the Tokyu Oimachi Line in Setagaya, Tokyo, Japan, operated by the private railway operator Tokyu Corporation.

Lines
It is numbered "OM14".

Station layout
The station has a single island platform below the surrounding ground level, serving two tracks, with an additional outer track to allow non-stop express trains to pass in the "up" (Oimachi) direction.

Platforms

History
The station opened on 1 November 1929.

Kaminoge station was rebuilt, with building work completed in March 2011. The new station building was designed by the architect Tadao Ando.

Passenger statistics
In fiscal 2011, the station was used by an average of 20,830 passengers daily.

Surrounding area
 Tama Art University
 Gotoh Museum
 St. Mary's International School

References

External links

 Tokyu station information 

Railway stations in Tokyo
Tokyu Oimachi Line
Stations of Tokyu Corporation
Railway stations in Japan opened in 1929
Tadao Ando buildings